Daniel Nguyen (born 1990) is a Vietnamese tennis player.

Dan Nguyen may also refer to:

 Dan Nguyen (born 1991), German field hockey player
 Danny Nguyen (fl. 1981–2008), Vietnamese American professional poker player